Pike City is a ghost town in Carter County, Oklahoma, United States. The town is located eight miles north of Healdton.

References

Ghost towns in Oklahoma